Carlos Figueroa may refer to:

 Carlos Figueroa (footballer) (born 1980), Guatemalan footballer
 Carlos Figueroa (equestrian) (1931–2012), Spanish equestrian
 Carlos Figueroa (judoka) (born 1985), Salvadoran judoka
 Carlos Mata Figueroa, Venezuelan general and politician
 Carlos Zúñiga Figueroa (1885–1964), Honduran painter